Zagryazhskoye is a rural locality (a village) in Kovarditskoye Rural Settlement, Muromsky District, Vladimir Oblast, Russia. The population was 152 as of 2010. There are 4 streets.

Geography 
Zagryazhskoye is located on the Ilevna River, 13 km south of Murom (the district's administrative centre) by road. Panfilovo is the nearest rural locality.

References 

Rural localities in Muromsky District